The Politics of Lazio, Italy takes place in a framework of a presidential representative democracy, whereby the President of Regional Government is the head of government, and of a pluriform multi-party system. Executive power is exercised by the Regional Government. Legislative power is vested in both the government and the Regional Council.

Executive branch
The Regional Government (Giunta Regionale) is presided by the President of the Region (Presidente della Regione), who is elected for a five-year term, and is composed by the president and the ministers (Assessori), who are currently 16, including a vice president.

List of presidents

Local government

Provinces

Municipalities

Provincial capitals

Legislative branch

The Regional Council of Lazio (Consiglio Regionale del Lazio) is composed of 51 members, of which 39 are elected in provincial constituencies with proportional representation, 10 from the so-called "regional list" of the elected president and the last one is for the candidate for president who comes second, who usually becomes the leader of the opposition in the council.

The council is elected for a five-year term, but, if the president suffers a vote of no confidence, resigns or dies, under the simul stabunt vel simul cadent clause (introduced in 1999), also the council will be dissolved and there will be a fresh election.

Parties and elections

Latest regional election

In the latest regional election, which took place on 12–13 February 2023, Francesco Rocca was elected President with the support of the centre-right coalition.

References

External links
Lazio Region
Regional Council of Lazio
Constitution of Lazio

 
Lazio